Wei Sawdong Falls is a three-tiered waterfall located in Cherrapunji, Meghalaya.

Location 
The fall is situated some 60 km southwest of Shillong in East Khasi Hills district and is in close proximity to another major waterfall, Dainthlen Falls. The name Wei Sawdong derives from the Khasi language (wei - resembling a pool, sawdong - square-shaped), spoken locally.  

Wei Sawdong is difficult to access, and the trek to the waterfall is along an out-and-back trail and challenging. The falls are especially known for their bluish-green, crystal-clear water.

Gallery

References 

Meghalaya
Waterfalls of India
Waterfalls of Meghalaya